Nithus is a 1981 role-playing game adventure for Traveller published by Group One.

Plot summary
Nithus is a supplement in which a high-tech planet of peace-loving bulldogs is the setting, one of the latest in Group One's series of planetary adventure locations for Traveller.

Publication history
Nithus was published in 1981 by Group One as a 16-page book with a large color map.

Reception
William A. Barton reviewed Nithus in The Space Gamer No. 47. Barton commented that "Though not as useful an adventure setting as their earlier Hyrdonauts, Nithus is at least more inspired than the recent Lomodo IVa.  If you've liked other G1 products, you'll probably like this one - and if you didn't, you won't."

References

Role-playing game supplements introduced in 1981
Traveller (role-playing game) adventures